Alexis Andrew Nicholas Koerner (19 April 1928 – 1 January 1984), known professionally as Alexis Korner, was a British blues musician and radio broadcaster, who has sometimes been referred to as "a founding father of British blues". A major influence on the sound of the British music scene in the 1960s, he was instrumental in the formation of several notable British bands including The Rolling Stones and Free.

Early career
Alexis Andrew Nicholas Koerner was born on 19 April 1928 in Paris, France, to an Austrian Jewish father and a mother of Greek, Turkish and Austrian descent. He spent his childhood in France, Switzerland and North Africa, and arrived in London in 1940 after the start of the Second World War. One memory of his youth was listening to a record by black pianist Jimmy Yancey during a German air raid. Korner said, "From then on all I wanted to do was play the blues."

After the war, Korner played piano and guitar (his first guitar was built by friend and author Sydney Hopkins, who wrote Mister God, This Is Anna) and in 1949 joined Chris Barber's Jazz Band where he met blues harmonica player Cyril Davies. They started playing together as a duo, started the influential London Blues and Barrelhouse Club in 1955 and made their first record together in 1957.

Korner made his first official record on Decca Records DFE 6286 in the company of Ken Colyer's Skiffle Group. His talent extended to playing mandolin on one of the tracks of this British EP, recorded in London on 28 July 1955. Korner encouraged many American blues artists, previously virtually unknown in Britain, to perform at the London Blues and Barrelhouse Club, which he established with Davies at the Round House pub in Soho.

The 1960s

In 1961, Korner and Davies formed Blues Incorporated, initially a loose-knit group of musicians with a shared love of electric blues and R&B music. The group included, at various times, Charlie Watts, Jack Bruce, Ginger Baker, Long John Baldry, Graham Bond, Danny Thompson and Dick Heckstall-Smith. It also attracted a wider crowd of mostly younger fans, some of whom occasionally performed with the group, including Mick Jagger, Keith Richards, Brian Jones, Geoff Bradford, Rod Stewart, John Mayall, and Jimmy Page.

Although Cyril Davies left the group in late 1962, Blues Incorporated continued to record, with Korner at the helm, until 1966. However, by that time its originally stellar line-up (and crowd of followers) had mostly left to start their own bands. While his one-time acolytes, the Rolling Stones and Cream, made the front pages of music magazines all over the world, Korner was relegated to the role of 'elder statesman'.

In 1966, Korner formed the trio Free At Last with Hughie Flint and Binky McKenzie. Flint later recalled “I played with Alexis, right after leaving The Bluesbreakers, in a trio, which Alexis named Free At Last, a sort of mini and slightly restricted version of Blues Incorporated. Playing with Alexis was very loose. We would play anything from Percy Mayfield’s ‘River’s Invitation’ to Charles Mingus' ‘Better Get It In Your Soul’ – with lots of freaky guitar and bass solos. Alexis, like John Mayall had the most eclectic taste in music, very knowledgeable, and generous, and I am indebted to both of them for my wide approach to music”.

Although Free At Last was short-lived, Korner ensured its name lived on in part by christening another young group of aspiring musicians, Free. Korner was instrumental in the formation of the band in April 1968, and continued to mentor them until they secured a deal with Island Records.

Although he himself was a blues purist, Korner criticised better-known British blues musicians during the blues boom of the late 1960s for their blind adherence to Chicago blues, as if the music came in no other form. He liked to surround himself with jazz musicians and often performed with a horn section drawn from a pool that included, among others, saxophone players Art Themen, Mel Collins, Dick Heckstall-Smith, and Lol Coxhill.

Broadcasting
In the 1960s Korner began a media career, working initially as a showbusiness interviewer and then on ITV's Five O'Clock Club, a children's TV show. Korner also wrote about blues for the music papers, and continued to maintain his own career as a blues artist, especially in Europe.

While touring Scandinavia he formed the band New Church with guitarist and singer Peter Thorup. They subsequently were one of the support bands at the Rolling Stones Free Concert in Hyde Park, London, on 5 July 1969. Jimmy Page reportedly found out about a new singer, Robert Plant, who had been jamming with Korner, who wondered why Plant had not yet been discovered. Plant and Korner were recording an album with Plant on vocals until Page had asked him to join "the New Yardbirds", a.k.a. Led Zeppelin. Only two songs are in circulation from these recordings: "Steal Away" and "Operator". Korner gave one of his last radio interviews to BBC Midlands on the Record Collectors Show with Mike Adams and Chris Savory.

1970s

In 1970, Korner and Thorup formed a big-band ensemble, CCS – short for "The Collective Consciousness Society" – which had several hit singles produced by Mickie Most, including a version of Led Zeppelin's "Whole Lotta Love", which was used as the theme for BBC's Top of the Pops between 1970 and 1981. Another instrumental called "Brother" was used as the theme to the BBC Radio 1 Top 20/40 when Tom Browne/Simon Bates presented the programme in the 1970s. It was also used in the 1990s on Radio Luxembourg for the Top 20 Singles chart. This was the period of Korner's greatest commercial success in the UK. In 1973, he provided a voice part for the Hot Chocolate single release Brother Louie.

1970s to 1984

In 1973, he and Peter Thorup formed another group, Snape, with Boz Burrell, Mel Collins, and Ian Wallace, who were previously together in King Crimson. Korner also played on B.B. King's In London album, and cut his own, similar "supersession" album; Get Off My Cloud, with Keith Richards, Steve Marriott, Peter Frampton, Nicky Hopkins and members of Joe Cocker's Grease Band. In the mid-1970s, while touring Germany, Korner established an intensive working relationship with bassist Colin Hodgkinson who played for the support act Back Door. They would continue to collaborate right up until Korner's death.

Korner's main career in the 1970s was in broadcasting. In 1973, he presented a six-part documentary on BBC Radio 1, The Rolling Stones Story, and in 1977 he established a Sunday-night show on Radio 1, Alexis Korner's Blues and Soul Show, which ran until 1981. He also used his gravelly voice to great effect as an advertising voice-over artist. In 1978, for Korner's 50th birthday, an all-star concert was held featuring many of his above-mentioned friends, as well as Eric Clapton, Paul Jones, Chris Farlowe, Zoot Money and others, which was later released as The Party Album, and as a video.

In 1981, Korner joined another "supergroup", Rocket 88, a project led by Ian Stewart based on boogie-woogie keyboard players, which featured a rhythm section comprising Jack Bruce and Charlie Watts, among others, as well as a horn section. They toured Europe and released an album on Atlantic Records. He played in Italy with Paul Jones and the Blues Society of Italian bluesman Guido Toffoletti.

Family life and death
In 1950, Korner married Roberta Melville (died 2021), daughter of art critic Robert Melville. He had a daughter, singer Sappho Gillett Korner (died 2006), and two sons, guitarist Nicholas 'Nico' Korner (died 1989) and sound engineer Damian Korner (died 2008).

Alexis Korner died in London from lung cancer on 1 January 1984, at the age of 55.

Album discography (selected UK and other releases)
 Blues from the Roundhouse 10" (1957) – Alexis Korner's Breakdown Group
 R&B from the Marquee (1962) – Alexis Korner's Blues Incorporated
 Red Hot from Alex (1964) – Alexis Korner's Blues Incorporated
 At the Cavern (1964) – Alexis Korner's Blues Incorporated
 Alexis Korner's Blues Incorporated (1965) – Alexis Korner's Blues Incorporated
 Sky High (1966) – Alexis Korner Blues Incorporated
 I Wonder Who (1967)
 Alexis Korner's Blues Incorporated (re-issue of Sky High) – Alexis Korner's Blues Incorporated
 A New Generation of Blues (1968)
 Both Sides (1970) – New Church
 CCS 1st (1970) – CCS
 Alexis Korner (1971)
 Bootleg Him! (1972)
 CCS 2nd (1972) – CCS
 Accidentally Borne in New Orleans (1973) – with Peter Thorup; Snape
 Live on Tour in Germany (1973) – with Peter Thorup; Snape
 The Best Band in the Land (1973) – CCS
 Alexis Korner (1974)
 Get Off My Cloud (1975)
 The Lost Album (1977)
 Just Easy (1978)
 The Party Album (1979) – Alexis Korner and Friends
 Me (1980)
 Rocket 88 (1981) – Rocket 88
 Juvenile Delinquent (1984)
 Testament (1985) – with Colin Hodgkinson
 Live in Paris (1988) – with Colin Hodgkinson

Bibliography
 Bob Brunning (1986), Blues: The British Connection, London: Helter Skelter, 2002. 
 Bob Brunning, The Fleetwood Mac Story: Rumours and Lies, Omnibus Press, 2004; foreword by B.B. King
 Dick Heckstall-Smith (2004), The Safest Place in the World: A Personal History of British Rhythm and blues, Clear Books. . First Edition: Blowing the Blues – Fifty Years Playing the British Blues
 Christopher Hjort, Strange Brew: Eric Clapton and the British Blues Boom, 1965–1970, foreword by John Mayall, Jawbone, 2007. 
 Harry Shapiro, Alexis Korner: The Biography, London: Bloomsbury Publishing PLC, 1997; Discography by Mark Troster.

References

External links

 [ Biography] at AllMusic
 Biography at British Music Experience
 Alexis Korner page at Radio Rewind
 BBC Radio 2 radio documentary about Alexis Korner on Vimeo
 
 

1928 births
1984 deaths
20th-century British guitarists
20th-century British male singers
BBC Radio 1 presenters
Blues Incorporated members
Blues revival musicians
British DJs
British blues guitarists
British blues singers
British male guitarists
British male singer-songwriters
British radio presenters
British rhythm and blues boom musicians
CCS (band) members
Charisma Records artists
Columbia Records artists
Deaths from lung cancer in England
Decca Records artists
English people of Austrian-Jewish descent
English people of Greek descent
English people of Turkish descent
Fontana Records artists
Liberty Records artists
Musicians from London
Polydor Records artists
Transatlantic Records artists
Warner Records artists